The Zhongyuan railway station is a railway station of Longhai railway located in Zhongyuan District, Zhengzhou, Henan, China.

The station is currently out of passenger services.

History
The station was opened in 1956 as Zhengzhou West railway station to serve the then newly development industrial zone in western Zhengzhou.

With the renaming of the Xingyang South railway station on the Zhengzhou-Xi'an high-speed railway to Zhengzhou West railway station, this station was renamed as Zhongyuan railway station effective from 10 July 2014.

References

Railway stations in Henan
Railway stations in Zhengzhou
Railway stations in China opened in 1956
Stations on the Longhai Railway